Sir John Rawcliffe Airey Crabtree,  (born 5 August 1949) is an English lawyer and businessman, a former High Sheriff of the West Midlands and current Lord Lieutenant of the West Midlands. He is chair of the organising committee of the 2022 Commonwealth Games and holds or has held a number of business and charity directorships and chairs.

Early life 

Crabtree was born on 5 August 1949 to Norman Lloyd and Joyce Mary Crabtree, and was educated at The Downs School, Colwall, and Radley College. He graduated in law from the University of Birmingham in 1972.

Career 

Crabtree joined the Birmingham solicitors Wragge & Co in 1973, retiring as a senior partner in 2003. 

He served as a Deputy Lieutenant of the West Midlands county in 2005, and as High Sheriff of the West Midlands in 2006/2007. He was President of Birmingham Chamber of Commerce and Industry and as a director of Advantage West Midlands. Since January 2017, has been the Lord Lieutenant of the West Midlands. As of 2022, he is a director of Birmingham Organising Committee for the 2022 Commonwealth Games Limited, and chairs the games' organising committee, a position to which he was appointed in 2018 by the then Prime Minister, Theresa May. He gave an address at the games' closing ceremony.

He is a special adviser to White & Black, the corporate and technology law firm founded in 2007 by Phil Riman. He holds a number of business directorships, including chairmanship of Glenn Howells Architects. He is president of the Heart of England Community Foundation, and a past chairman (2008–2017) of the charity Sense, The National Deafblind and Rubella Association, and of Birmingham Hippodrome (2001–2017).

Honours and awards 

Crabtree was appointed Officer of the Order of the British Empire (OBE) in the 2007 Birthday Honours for services to SENSE. He holds honorary doctorates from both the University of Birmingham and Birmingham City University. He was voted "Lawyer of the Year" in the 2003 Legal Business Awards. In 2012, he was given a lifetime achievement award in the Birmingham Post Business Awards. He was knighted in the 2023 New Year Honours for services to sport and to the community in the West Midlands.

Personal life 
Crabtree and his wife, Diana, live in Crowle, Worcestershire. He is father to three daughters and three sons.

References 

Living people
High Sheriffs of the West Midlands
Lord-Lieutenants of the West Midlands
Officers of the Order of the British Empire
English lawyers
1949 births
Knights Bachelor
Lawyers awarded knighthoods
Leaders of organizations
Business people from Worcestershire
Alumni of the University of Birmingham
People educated at Radley College
People educated at The Downs School, Herefordshire